The Fishkill Village District is a federally recognized historic district in that New York community. It is roughly defined as Main Street (NY 52) between Cary and Hopewell streets. Of the 108 buildings within this district, those that are contributing properties date from between the late 18th century to the late 19th century. A variety of architectural styles are represented, but predominant among them are several Greek Revival buildings.

It was added to the National Register of Historic Places in 1973.

References

External links

Historic districts on the National Register of Historic Places in New York (state)
Fishkill, New York
National Register of Historic Places in Dutchess County, New York
Historic districts in Dutchess County, New York